Thornhills is a hamlet in the Kirklees District, in the county of West Yorkshire. It is near the town of Brighouse.

Hamlets in West Yorkshire
Geography of Kirklees